Clarkson Potter (September 19, 1880 – October 4, 1953) was an American golfer. He competed in the men's individual event at the 1904 Summer Olympics.

References

External links
 

1880 births
1953 deaths
Amateur golfers
American male golfers
Olympic golfers of the United States
Golfers at the 1904 Summer Olympics
Sportspeople from Kansas City, Missouri